Alexander Buchanan, Alex Buchanan or Alexander Buchan may refer to:

Alexander Buchanan
 Alexander Buchanan, prisoner on the St. Michael of Scarborough
 Alex Buchanan (politician) (1905–1985), Australian politician
 Alexander Buchanan Campbell (1914–2007), Scottish architect
 Alexander Buchanan (soldier) (d. 1424), eldest of the three sons of Sir Walter Buchanan, eleventh Laird of Buchanan
 Alan Alexander Buchanan (1905–1984), Anglican bishop
 Eric Alexander Buchanan (1848–1928), the 3rd Baronet Buchanan of Dunburgh
 John Alexander Buchanan (1887–1976), Canadian politician and civil engineer
 Alexander Buchanan (judge) (1848–1930), of Supreme Court of South Australia
 John Alexander Buchanan (1887–1976), Canadian politician and civil engineer
 Bender (rapper) (1980–2018), Canadian underground hip hop artist
 Alexander McKenzie Buchanan (1805–1868), Justice of the Louisiana Supreme Court

Alex Buchanan
 Mayor Alex Buchanan, fictional character; see One Life to Live storylines (1990–1999)
 Alexandria "Alex" Isaacson Buchanan, fictional character
 Alex Buchanan (singer)
 Alex Buchanan, better known as Kingkade, progressive house DJ and music producer

Alexander Buchan
 Alexander Buchan (artist) (d. 1769), Scottish landscape artist
 Alexander Buchan (mathematician) (1904–1976), Scottish mathematician
 Alexander Buchan (meteorologist) (1829–1907), Scottish meteorologist